was a feudal domain under the Tokugawa shogunate of Edo period Japan, located in Harima Province in what is now the southwestern portion of modern-day Hyōgo Prefecture. It was centered around Akō Castle, which is located in what is now the city of Akō, Hyōgo.

History
During the Muromachi period, the area of Akō District was under the control of the Akamatsu clan, the shugo of Harima Province. In the Sengoku period, it was part of the holdings of Ukita Hideie. During the Battle of Sekigahara, Ukita Hideie sided with the losing Western Army, and his territories were confiscated by the victorious Tokugawa Ieyasu, who awarded the area to his general and son-in-law Ikeda Terumasa. His vast holdings were broken up after his death, and his fifth son, Ikeda Masatsuna received a 35,000 koku portion which had been assigned as the widow's portion to his mother Tokuhime. This marked the start of Akō Domain. HIs younger brother, Ikeda Teruoki, inherited the domain in 1631. However, he went insane in 1645, murdering his concubine and several ladies-in-waiting, and was dispossessed.

The domain was awarded to Asano Naganao, formerly of Kasama Domain in Hitachi Province. Nagaoki spend 13 years building Akō Castle on a scale far in excess of his kokudaka of 53,000 koku and also reconstructed the castle town. In order to alleviate the financial situation, he expanded on coastal salt production (which had been a speciality of the area since the Yayoi period to support the clan's finances. The third daimyō, Asano Naganori was assigned to provide security for the 1682 Joseon missions to Japan and also had to handle a judicial case involving the assassination of Tairō Hotta Masatoshi by  Inaba Masayasu. However, he is more famously known for being one the principal participants in the famous 1702  Akō Incident, in which he was forced to commit seppuku after attempting to kill a powerful shogunal named Kira Yoshinaka and was subsequently avenged by his now masterless retainers. 

The Asano clan was replaced at Akō Domain by Nagai Naohiro, formerly of Karasuyama Domain in Shimotsuke Province. However, five years later, in 1706, he was transferred to Iiyama Domain in Shinano Province. The domain was then given to Mori Naganao, who had been daimyō of a 20,000 koku sub-domain of Tsuyama Domain called "Nishiebara Domain". The Mori clan ruled Akō for 165 years until the end of the Edo period. During the Bakumatsu period, pro-Sonnō jōi samurai murdered the domain's karō in front of the gate of Akō Castle in 1861. The revolt was suppressed and seven of the 13 perpetrators were executed. In 1871, with the abolition of the han system, Akō Domain became Akō Prefecture, and was incorporated into Hyōgo prefecture via Shikama Prefecture. The Mori family became a viscount (shishaku) in the kazoku peerage system in 1884.

Holdings at the end of the Edo period
As with most domains in the han system, Ako Domain consisted of several discontinuous territories calculated to provide the assigned kokudaka, based on periodic cadastral surveys and projected agricultural yields.

Harima Province 
42 villages in Ako District

List of daimyō 

{| class=wikitable
! #||Name || Tenure || Courtesy title || Court Rank || kokudaka 
|-
|colspan=6|  Ikeda clan, 1615-1645 (Tozama)
|-
||1||||1615 - 1631||Ukyō-no-daifu (右京大夫)||  Junior 4th Rank, Lower Grade (従四位下)|| 35,000 koku
|-
||2||||1631 - 1645||Ukyō-no-daifu (右京大夫)||  Junior 4th Rank, Lower Grade (従四位下)|| 35,000 koku
|-
|colspan=6|  Asano clan, 1645-1701 (Tozama)
|-
||1||||1645 - 1671||Uchi-no-takumi-no-kami (内匠頭)|| Junior 5th Rank, Lower Grade (従五位下)||53,000 koku
|-
||2||||1671 - 1675||Uneme-no-kami (采女正)|| Junior 5th Rank, Lower Grade (従五位下)||53,000 -> 50,000 koku
|-
||3||||1675 - 1701||Uchi-no-takumi-no-kami (内匠頭)|| Junior 5th Rank, Lower Grade (従五位下)||50,000 koku
|-
|colspan=6|  Nagai clan, 1701-1706 (Fudai)
|-
||1||||1701 - 1706||Iga-no-kami (伊賀守)|| Junior 5th Rank, Lower Grade (従五位下)||32,000 koku
|-
|colspan=6|  Mori clan, 1706-1871 (Tozama)
|-
|1||||1706 - 1722||Izumi-no-kami (和泉守)|| Junior 5th Rank, Lower Grade (従五位下)||20,000 koku
|-
||2||||1722 - 1723||Shima-no-kami (志摩守)|| Junior 5th Rank, Lower Grade (従五位下)||20,000 koku
|-
||3||||1723 - 1731||Etchū-no-kami (越中守)|| Junior 5th Rank, Lower Grade (従五位下)|| 20,000 koku
|-
||4||||1731 - 1746||Ise-no-kami (伊勢守)|| Junior 5th Rank, Lower Grade (従五位下)|| 20,000 koku
|-
||5||||1747 - 1769||Izumi-no-kami (和泉守)|| Junior 5th Rank, Lower Grade (従五位下)||20,000 koku
|-
||6||||1769 - 1780||Yamashiro-no-kami (山城守)|| Junior 5th Rank, Lower Grade (従五位下)||20,000 koku
|-
||7||||1780 - 1801||Uhyoe-no-suke (右兵衛佐)|| Junior 5th Rank, Lower Grade (従五位下)|| 20,000 koku
|-
||8||||1801 - 1807||Izumi-no-kami (和泉守)|| Junior 5th Rank, Lower Grade (従五位下)||20,000 koku
|-
||9||||1807 - 1824||Etchū-no-kami (越中守)|| Junior 5th Rank, Lower Grade (従五位下)|| 20,000 koku
|-
||10||||1824 - 1827|| -none- || -none- || 20,000 koku
|-
||10||||1827 - 1862||Etchū-no-kami (越中守)|| Junior 5th Rank, Lower Grade (従五位下)|| 20,000 koku
|-
||11||||1862 - 1868||Mimasaka-no-kami (美作守)|| Junior 5th Rank, Lower Grade (従五位下)|| 20,000 koku
|-
||12||||1868 - 1871||Mimasaka-no-kami (美作守)|| Junior 5th Rank, Lower Grade (従五位下)|| 20,000 koku
|-
|}

See also 
 List of Han
 Abolition of the han system

Further reading
 Bolitho, Harold. (1974). Treasures Among Men: The Fudai Daimyo in Tokugawa Japan. New Haven: Yale University Press.  ;  OCLC 185685588

References

Domains of Japan
1615 establishments in Japan
States and territories established in 1615
1871 disestablishments in Japan
States and territories disestablished in 1871
Harima Province
Domains of Hyōgo Prefecture